Jeff Gyasi (born 4 January 1989) is a Nigerian professional footballer who plays for German club BSV Schwarz-Weiß Rehden as a midfielder.

Gyasi made his professional debut for Rot-Weiß Oberhausen during the 2010–11 3. Fußball-Liga season in a 0–3 home loss to 1. FC Heidenheim.

References 

1989 births
Living people
German footballers
Nigerian footballers
Association football midfielders
3. Liga players
Regionalliga players
Rot-Weiß Oberhausen players
SG Wattenscheid 09 players
SV Wehen Wiesbaden players
SV Elversberg players
People from Gladbeck
Sportspeople from Münster (region)
Footballers from North Rhine-Westphalia